President Wilson in Paris is a 1973 Australian television film based on the play by Ron Blair set during the Paris Peace Conference, 1919.

References

External links
President Wilson in Paris at AustLit
President Wilson in Paris at AusStage

Australian television films
1973 television films
1973 films
Films directed by Julian Pringle
1970s English-language films
1970s Australian films